Ulrica Charlotta Falkman (1795–1882), was a Swedish-Finnish novelist .

Falkman was born in Sweden to the Swedish Lieutenant Isaac Otto Falkman (1761–1817) and Maria Elisabeth Govenia.  While Falkman was a child, her mother moved with her to Helsinki

An educated woman who spoke French, Swedish and Finnish, Falkman was described as refined, accomplished and with a polished manner. She worked as a governess until hearing loss led her to take up sewing and, finally, writing. Falkman never became wealthy, but lived as a lodger in the homes of wealthy families in Helsinki. She never married and had no children. Falkman spent her last years in a home for the terminally ill.

Falkman's novels were published both in Finnish magazines and in book form. While she wrote her novels in Swedish, then the language of the contemporary Finnish elite, Falkman belongs to the pioneer novelists as well as female novelists in Finland. Her novels described the contemporary lives for women in the Swedish-Finnish elite as well the hardships of the laboring classes.

Works

 En prestgård i N-d, af en finsk medborgarinna.    Johanna Cederwaller & Son, Wiborg 1847
 Nyårsafton. Original af U-a.     A. F. Cederwallers förlag, Wiborg 1848
 Leonna, en skildring ur lifvet.     J. W. Lillja, Åbo 1854
 Frimurarens Fosterson : en tidsbild från 18:e seklet.   G. W. Edlund, Helsingfors 1864

References 

1795 births
1882 deaths
19th-century Finnish women writers
19th-century Finnish writers
19th-century Finnish educators
Governesses
19th-century women educators